The Organization of the Petroleum Exporting Countries (OPEC) is an organization enabling the co-operation of leading oil-producing countries, in order to collectively influence the global market and maximise profit. Founded on 14 September 1960 in Baghdad by the first five members (Iran, Iraq, Kuwait, Saudi Arabia, and Venezuela), it has, since 1965, been headquartered in Vienna, Austria, although Austria is not an OPEC member state. , the 13 member countries accounted for an estimated 44 percent of global oil production and 81.5 percent of the world's proven oil reserves, giving OPEC a major influence on global oil prices that were previously determined by the so-called "Seven Sisters" grouping of multinational oil companies.

The formation of OPEC marked a turning point toward national sovereignty over natural resources, and OPEC decisions have come to play a prominent role in the global oil market and international relations. The effect can be particularly strong when wars or civil disorders lead to extended interruptions in supply. In the 1970s, restrictions in oil production led to a dramatic rise in oil prices and in the revenue and wealth of OPEC, with long-lasting and far-reaching consequences for the global economy. In the 1980s, OPEC began setting production targets for its member nations; generally, when the targets are reduced, oil prices increase. This has occurred most recently from the organization's 2008 and 2016 decisions to trim oversupply.

Economists have characterized OPEC as a textbook example of a cartel that cooperates to reduce market competition, but one whose consultations are protected by the doctrine of state immunity under international law. In the 1960s and 1970s, OPEC successfully restructured the global oil production system so that decision-making authority and the vast majority of profits is in the hands of oil-producing countries. Since the 1980s, OPEC has had a limited impact on world oil supply and price stability, as there is frequent cheating by members on their commitments to one another, and as member commitments reflect what they would do even in the absence of OPEC.

 Algeria, Angola, Equatorial Guinea, Gabon, Iran, Iraq, Kuwait, Libya, Nigeria, the Republic of the Congo, Saudi Arabia, the United Arab Emirates and Venezuela. Meanwhile, Ecuador, Indonesia and Qatar are former OPEC members. A larger group called OPEC+ was formed in late 2016 to have more control on the global crude oil market.

Organization and structure
In a series of steps in the 1960s and 1970s, OPEC restructured the global system of oil production in favor of oil-producing states and away from an oligopoly of dominant Anglo-American oil firms (the Seven Sisters). Coordination among oil-producing states within OPEC made it easier for them to nationalize oil production and structure oil prices in their favor without incurring punishment by Western governments and firms. Prior to the creation of OPEC, individual oil-producing states were punished for taking steps to alter the governing arrangements of oil production within their borders. States were coerced militarily (e.g. in 1953, the US-UK-sponsored a coup against Mohammad Mosaddegh after he nationalized Iran's oil production) or economically (e.g. the Seven Sisters slowed down oil production in one non-compliant state and ramped up oil production elsewhere) when acted contrary to the interests of the Seven Sisters and their governments.

The organizational logic that underpins OPEC is that it is in the collective interest of its members to limit the world oil supply in order to reap higher prices. However, the main problem within OPEC is that it is individually rational for members to cheat on commitments and produce as much oil as possible.

Political scientist Jeff Colgan has argued that OPEC has since the 1980s largely failed to achieve its goals (limits on world oil supply, stabilized prices, and raising of long-term average revenues). He finds that members have cheated on 96% of their commitments. To the extent that member states comply with their commitments, it is because the commitments reflect what they would do even if OPEC did not exist. One large reason for the frequent cheating is that OPEC does not punish members for non-compliance with commitments.

Leadership and decision-making 

The OPEC Conference is the supreme authority of the organization, and consists of delegations normally headed by the oil ministers of member countries. The chief executive of the organization is the OPEC secretary general. The conference ordinarily meets at the Vienna headquarters, at least twice a year and in additional extraordinary sessions when necessary. It generally operates on the principles of unanimity and "one member, one vote", with each country paying an equal membership fee into the annual budget. However, since Saudi Arabia is by far the largest and most-profitable oil exporter in the world, with enough capacity to function as the traditional swing producer to balance the global market, it serves as "OPEC's de facto leader".

International cartel 
At various times, OPEC members have displayed apparent anti-competitive cartel behavior through the organization's agreements about oil production and price levels. Economists often cite OPEC as a textbook example of a cartel that cooperates to reduce market competition, as in this definition from OECD's Glossary of Industrial Organisation Economics and Competition Law:

OPEC members strongly prefer to describe their organization as a modest force for market stabilization, rather than a powerful anti-competitive cartel. In its defense, the organization was founded as a counterweight against the previous "Seven Sisters" cartel of multinational oil companies, and non-OPEC energy suppliers have maintained enough market share for a substantial degree of worldwide competition. Moreover, because of an economic "prisoner's dilemma" that encourages each member nation individually to discount its price and exceed its production quota, widespread cheating within OPEC often erodes its ability to influence global oil prices through collective action. Political scientist Jeff Colgan has challenged that OPEC is a cartel, pointing to endemic cheating in the organization: "A cartel needs to set tough goals and meet them; OPEC sets easy goals and fails to meet even those."

OPEC has not been involved in any disputes related to the competition rules of the World Trade Organization, even though the objectives, actions, and principles of the two organizations diverge considerably. A key US District Court decision held that OPEC consultations are protected as "governmental" acts of state by the Foreign Sovereign Immunities Act, and are therefore beyond the legal reach of US competition law governing "commercial" acts. Despite popular sentiment against OPEC, legislative proposals to limit the organization's sovereign immunity, such as the NOPEC Act, have so far been unsuccessful.

Conflicts
OPEC often has difficulty agreeing on policy decisions because its member countries differ widely in their oil export capacities, production costs, reserves, geological features, population, economic development, budgetary situations, and political circumstances. Indeed, over the course of market cycles, oil reserves can themselves become a source of serious conflict, instability and imbalances, in what economists call the "natural resource curse". A further complication is that religion-linked conflicts in the Middle East are recurring features of the geopolitical landscape for this oil-rich region. Internationally important conflicts in OPEC's history have included the Six-Day War (1967), Yom Kippur War (1973), a hostage siege directed by Palestinian militants (1975), the Iranian Revolution (1979), Iran–Iraq War (1980–1988), Iraqi occupation of Kuwait (1990–1991), September 11 attacks (2001), American occupation of Iraq (2003–2011), Conflict in the Niger Delta (2004–present), Arab Spring (2010–2012), Libyan Crisis (2011–present), and international Embargo against Iran (2012–2016). Although events such as these can temporarily disrupt oil supplies and elevate prices, the frequent disputes and instabilities tend to limit OPEC's long-term cohesion and effectiveness.

History and impact

Post-WWII situation
In 1949, Venezuela and Iran took the earliest steps in the direction of OPEC, by inviting Iraq, Kuwait and Saudi Arabia to improve communication among petroleum-exporting nations as the world recovered from World War II. At the time, some of the world's largest oil fields were just entering production in the Middle East. The United States had established the Interstate Oil Compact Commission to join the Texas Railroad Commission in limiting overproduction. The US was simultaneously the world's largest producer and consumer of oil; and the world market was dominated by a group of multinational companies known as the "Seven Sisters", five of which were headquartered in the US following the breakup of John D. Rockefeller's original Standard Oil monopoly. Oil-exporting countries were eventually motivated to form OPEC as a counterweight to this concentration of political and economic power.

1959–1960: anger from exporting countries
In February 1959, as new supplies were becoming available, the multinational oil companies (MOCs) unilaterally reduced their posted prices for Venezuelan and Middle Eastern crude oil by 10 percent. Weeks later, the Arab League's first Arab Petroleum Congress convened in Cairo, Egypt, where the influential journalist Wanda Jablonski introduced Saudi Arabia's Abdullah Tariki to Venezuela's observer Juan Pablo Pérez Alfonzo, representing the two then-largest oil-producing nations outside the United States and the Soviet Union. Both oil ministers were angered by the price cuts, and the two led their fellow delegates to establish the Maadi Pact or Gentlemen's Agreement, calling for an "Oil Consultation Commission" of exporting countries, to which MOCs should present price-change plans. Jablonski reported a marked hostility toward the West and a growing outcry against "absentee landlordism" of the MOCs, which at the time controlled all oil operations within the exporting countries and wielded enormous political influence. In August 1960, ignoring the warnings, and with the US favoring Canadian and Mexican oil for strategic reasons, the MOCs again unilaterally announced significant cuts in their posted prices for Middle Eastern crude oil.

1960–1975: founding and expansion

The following month, during 10–14 September 1960, the Baghdad Conference was held at the initiative of Tariki, Pérez Alfonzo, and Iraqi prime minister Abd al-Karim Qasim, whose country had skipped the 1959 congress. Government representatives from Iran, Iraq, Kuwait, Saudi Arabia and Venezuela met in Baghdad to discuss ways to increase the price of crude oil produced by their countries, and ways to respond to unilateral actions by the MOCs. Despite strong US opposition: "Together with Arab and non-Arab producers, Saudi Arabia formed the Organization of Petroleum Export Countries (OPEC) to secure the best price available from the major oil corporations." The Middle Eastern members originally called for OPEC headquarters to be in Baghdad or Beirut, but Venezuela argued for a neutral location, and so the organization chose Geneva, Switzerland. On 1 September 1965, OPEC moved to Vienna, Austria, after Switzerland declined to extend diplomatic privileges.

During the early years of OPEC, the oil-producing countries had a 50/50 profit agreement with the oil companies. OPEC bargained with the dominant oil companies (the Seven Sisters), but OPEC faced coordination problems among its members. If one OPEC member demanded too much from the oil companies, then the oil companies could slow down production in that country and ramp up production elsewhere. The 50/50 agreements were still in place until 1970 when Libya negotiated a 58/42 agreement with the oil company Occidental, which prompted other OPEC members to request better agreements with oil companies. In 1971, an accord was signed between major oil companies and members of OPEC doing business in the Mediterranean Sea region, called the Tripoli Agreement. The agreement, signed on 2 April 1971, raised oil prices and increased producing countries' profit shares.

During 1961–1975, the five founding nations were joined by Qatar (1961), Indonesia (1962–2008, rejoined 2014–2016), Libya (1962), United Arab Emirates (originally just the Emirate of Abu Dhabi, 1967), Algeria (1969), Nigeria (1971), Ecuador (1973–1992, 2007–2020), and Gabon (1975–1994, rejoined 2016). By the early 1970s, OPEC's membership accounted for more than half of worldwide oil production. Indicating that OPEC is not averse to further expansion, Mohammed Barkindo, OPEC's acting secretary general in 2006, urged his African neighbors Angola and Sudan to join, and Angola did in 2007, followed by Equatorial Guinea in 2017. Since the 1980s, representatives from Egypt, Mexico, Norway, Oman, Russia, and other oil-exporting nations have attended many OPEC meetings as observers, as an informal mechanism for coordinating policies.

1973–1974: oil embargo

The oil market was tight in the early 1970s, which reduced the risks for OPEC members in nationalizing their oil production. One of the major fears for OPEC members was that nationalization would cause a steep decline in the price of oil. This prompted a wave of nationalizations in countries such as Libya, Algeria, Iraq, Nigeria, Saudi Arabia and Venezuela. With greater control over oil production decisions and amid high oil prices, OPEC members unilaterally raised oil prices in 1973, prompting the 1973 oil crisis.

In October 1973, the Organization of Arab Petroleum Exporting Countries (OAPEC, consisting of the Arab majority of OPEC plus Egypt and Syria) declared significant production cuts and an oil embargo against the United States and other industrialized nations that supported Israel in the Yom Kippur War. A previous embargo attempt was largely ineffective in response to the Six-Day War in 1967. However, in 1973, the result was a sharp rise in oil prices and OPEC revenues, from US$3/bbl to US$12/bbl, and an emergency period of energy rationing, intensified by panic reactions, a declining trend in US oil production, currency devaluations, and a lengthy UK coal-miners dispute. For a time, the UK imposed an emergency three-day workweek. Seven European nations banned non-essential Sunday driving. US gas stations limited the amount of gasoline that could be dispensed, closed on Sundays, and restricted the days when gasoline could be purchased, based on license plate numbers. Even after the embargo ended in March 1974, following intense diplomatic activity, prices continued to rise. The world experienced a global economic recession, with unemployment and inflation surging simultaneously, steep declines in stock and bond prices, major shifts in trade balances and petrodollar flows, and a dramatic end to the post-WWII economic boom.

The 1973–1974, oil embargo had lasting effects on the United States and other industrialized nations, which established the International Energy Agency in response, as well as national emergency stockpiles designed to withstand months of future supply disruptions. Oil conservation efforts included lower speed limits on highways, smaller and more energy-efficient cars and appliances, year-round daylight saving time, reduced usage of heating and air-conditioning, better building insulation, increased support of mass transit, and greater emphasis on coal, natural gas, ethanol, nuclear and other alternative energy sources. These long-term efforts became effective enough that US oil consumption rose only 11 percent during 1980–2014, while real GDP rose 150 percent. But in the 1970s, OPEC nations demonstrated convincingly that their oil could be used as both a political and economic weapon against other nations, at least in the short term.

The embargo also meant that a section of the Non-Aligned Movement saw power as a source of hope for their developing countries. The Algerian president Houari Boumédiène expressed this hope in a speech at the UN's sixth Special Session, in April 1974:

1975–1980: Special Fund, now the OPEC Fund for International Development

OPEC's international aid activities date from well before the 1973–1974 oil price surge. For example, the Kuwait Fund for Arab Economic Development has operated since 1961.

In the years after 1973, as an example of so-called "checkbook diplomacy", certain Arab nations have been among the world's largest providers of foreign aid, and OPEC added to its goals the selling of oil for the socio-economic growth of poorer nations. The OPEC Special Fund was conceived in Algiers, Algeria, in March 1975, and was formally established the following January. "A Solemn Declaration 'reaffirmed the natural solidarity which unites OPEC countries with other developing countries in their struggle to overcome underdevelopment,' and called for measures to strengthen cooperation between these countries... [The OPEC Special Fund's] resources are additional to those already made available by OPEC states through a number of bilateral and multilateral channels." The Fund became an official international development agency in May 1980 and was renamed the OPEC Fund for International Development, with Permanent Observer status at the United Nations. In 2020, the institution ceased using the abbreviation OFID.

1975: hostage siege

On 21 December 1975, Saudi Arabia's Ahmed Zaki Yamani, Iran's Jamshid Amuzegar, and the other OPEC oil ministers were taken hostage at their semi-annual conference in Vienna, Austria. The attack, which killed three non-ministers, was orchestrated by a six-person team led by Venezuelan terrorist "Carlos the Jackal", and which included Gabriele Kröcher-Tiedemann and Hans-Joachim Klein. The self-named "Arm of the Arab Revolution" group declared its goal to be the liberation of Palestine. Carlos planned to take over the conference by force and hold for ransom all eleven attending oil ministers, except for Yamani and Amuzegar who were to be executed.

Carlos arranged bus and plane travel for his team and 42 of the original 63 hostages, with stops in Algiers and Tripoli, planning to fly eventually to Baghdad, where Yamani and Amuzegar were to be killed. All 30 non-Arab hostages were released in Algiers, excluding Amuzegar. Additional hostages were released at another stop in Tripoli before returning to Algiers. With only 10 hostages remaining, Carlos held a phone conversation with Algerian president Houari Boumédiène, who informed Carlos that the oil ministers' deaths would result in an attack on the plane. Boumédienne must also have offered Carlos asylum at this time and possibly financial compensation for failing to complete his assignment. Carlos expressed his regret at not being able to murder Yamani and Amuzegar, then he and his comrades left the plane. All the hostages and terrorists walked away from the situation, two days after it began.

Some time after the attack, Carlos's accomplices revealed that the operation was commanded by Wadie Haddad, a founder of the Popular Front for the Liberation of Palestine. They also claimed that the idea and funding came from an Arab president, widely thought to be Muammar Gaddafi of Libya, itself an OPEC member. Fellow militants Bassam Abu Sharif and Klein claimed that Carlos received and kept a ransom between 20 million and US$50 million from "an Arab president". Carlos claimed that Saudi Arabia paid ransom on behalf of Iran, but that the money was "diverted en route and lost by the Revolution". He was finally captured in 1994 and is serving life sentences for at least 16 other murders.

1979–1980: oil crisis and 1980s oil glut

In response to a wave of oil nationalizations and the high prices of the 1970s, industrial nations took steps to reduce their dependence on OPEC oil, especially after prices reached new peaks approaching US$40/bbl in 1979–1980 when the Iranian Revolution and Iran–Iraq War disrupted regional stability and oil supplies. Electric utilities worldwide switched from oil to coal, natural gas, or nuclear power; national governments initiated multibillion-dollar research programs to develop alternatives to oil; and commercial exploration developed major non-OPEC oilfields in Siberia, Alaska, the North Sea, and the Gulf of Mexico. By 1986, daily worldwide demand for oil dropped by 5 million barrels, non-OPEC production rose by an even-larger amount, and OPEC's market share sank from approximately 50 percent in 1979 to less than 30 percent in 1985. Illustrating the volatile multi-year timeframes of typical market cycles for natural resources, the result was a six-year decline in the price of oil, which culminated by plunging more than half in 1986 alone. As one oil analyst summarized succinctly: "When the price of something as essential as oil spikes, humanity does two things: finds more of it and finds ways to use less of it."

To combat falling revenue from oil sales, in 1982 Saudi Arabia pressed OPEC for audited national production quotas in an attempt to limit output and boost prices. When other OPEC nations failed to comply, Saudi Arabia first slashed its own production from 10 million barrels daily in 1979–1981 to just one-third of that level in 1985. When even this proved ineffective, Saudi Arabia reversed course and flooded the market with cheap oil, causing prices to fall below US$10/bbl and higher-cost producers to become unprofitable. Faced with increasing economic hardship (which ultimately contributed to the collapse of the Soviet bloc in 1989), the "free-riding" oil exporters that had previously failed to comply with OPEC agreements finally began to limit production to shore up prices, based on painstakingly negotiated national quotas that sought to balance oil-related and economic criteria since 1986. (Within their sovereign-controlled territories, the national governments of OPEC members are able to impose production limits on both government-owned and private oil companies.) Generally when OPEC production targets are reduced, oil prices increase.

1990–2003: ample supply and modest disruptions

Leading up to his August 1990 Invasion of Kuwait, Iraqi President Saddam Hussein was pushing OPEC to end overproduction and to send oil prices higher, in order to help OPEC members financially and to accelerate rebuilding from the 1980–1988 Iran–Iraq War. But these two Iraqi wars against fellow OPEC founders marked a low point in the cohesion of the organization, and oil prices subsided quickly after the short-term supply disruptions. The September 2001 Al Qaeda attacks on the US and the March 2003 US invasion of Iraq had even milder short-term impacts on oil prices, as Saudi Arabia and other exporters again cooperated to keep the world adequately supplied.

In the 1990s, OPEC lost its two newest members, who had joined in the mid-1970s. Ecuador withdrew in December 1992, because it was unwilling to pay the annual US$2 million membership fee and felt that it needed to produce more oil than it was allowed under the OPEC quota, although it rejoined in October 2007. Similar concerns prompted Gabon to suspend membership in January 1995; it rejoined in July 2016. Iraq has remained a member of OPEC since the organization's founding, but Iraqi production was not a part of OPEC quota agreements from 1998 to 2016, due to the country's daunting political difficulties.

Lower demand triggered by the 1997–1998 Asian financial crisis saw the price of oil fall back to 1986 levels. After oil slumped to around US$10/bbl, joint diplomacy achieved a gradual slowing of oil production by OPEC, Mexico and Norway. After prices slumped again in Nov. 2001, OPEC, Norway, Mexico, Russia, Oman and Angola agreed to cut production on 1 January 2002 for 6 months. OPEC contributed 1.5 million barrels a day (mbpd) to the approximately 2 mbpd of cuts announced.

In June 2003, the International Energy Agency (IEA) and OPEC held their first joint workshop on energy issues. They have continued to meet regularly since then, "to collectively better understand trends, analysis and viewpoints and advance market transparency and predictability."

2003–2011: volatility

Widespread insurgency and sabotage occurred during the 2003–2008 height of the American occupation of Iraq, coinciding with rapidly increasing oil demand from China and commodity-hungry investors, recurring violence against the Nigerian oil industry, and dwindling spare capacity as a cushion against potential shortages. This combination of forces prompted a sharp rise in oil prices to levels far higher than those previously targeted by OPEC. Price volatility reached an extreme in 2008, as WTI crude oil surged to a record US$147/bbl in July and then plunged back to US$32/bbl in December, during the worst global recession since World War II. OPEC's annual oil export revenue also set a new record in 2008, estimated around US$1 trillion, and reached similar annual rates in 2011–2014 (along with extensive petrodollar recycling activity) before plunging again. By the time of the 2011 Libyan Civil War and Arab Spring, OPEC started issuing explicit statements to counter "excessive speculation" in oil futures markets, blaming financial speculators for increasing volatility beyond market fundamentals.

In May 2008, Indonesia announced that it would leave OPEC when its membership expired at the end of that year, having become a net importer of oil and being unable to meet its production quota. A statement released by OPEC on 10 September 2008 confirmed Indonesia's withdrawal, noting that OPEC "regretfully accepted the wish of Indonesia to suspend its full membership in the organization, and recorded its hope that the country would be in a position to rejoin the organization in the not-too-distant future."

2008: production dispute

The differing economic needs of OPEC member states often affect the internal debates behind OPEC production quotas. Poorer members have pushed for production cuts from fellow members, to increase the price of oil and thus their own revenues. These proposals conflict with Saudi Arabia's stated long-term strategy of being a partner with the world's economic powers to ensure a steady flow of oil that would support economic expansion. Part of the basis for this policy is the Saudi concern that overly expensive oil or unreliable supply will drive industrial nations to conserve energy and develop alternative fuels, curtailing the worldwide demand for oil and eventually leaving unneeded barrels in the ground. To this point, Saudi Oil Minister Yamani famously remarked in 1973: "The Stone Age didn't end because we ran out of stones."

On 10 September 2008, with oil prices still near US$100/bbl, a production dispute occurred when the Saudis reportedly walked out of a negotiating session where rival members voted to reduce OPEC output. Although Saudi delegates officially endorsed the new quotas, they stated anonymously that they would not observe them. The New York Times quoted one such delegate as saying: "Saudi Arabia will meet the market's demand. We will see what the market requires and we will not leave a customer without oil. The policy has not changed." Over the next few months, oil prices plummeted into the $30s, and did not return to $100 until the Libyan Civil War in 2011.

2014–2017: oil glut

During 2014–2015, OPEC members consistently exceeded their production ceiling, and China experienced a slowdown in economic growth. At the same time, US oil production nearly doubled from 2008 levels and approached the world-leading "swing producer" volumes of Saudi Arabia and Russia, due to the substantial long-term improvement and spread of shale "fracking" technology in response to the years of record oil prices. These developments led in turn to a plunge in US oil import requirements (moving closer to energy independence), a record volume of worldwide oil inventories, and a collapse in oil prices that continued into early 2016.

In spite of global oversupply, on 27 November 2014 in Vienna, Saudi oil minister Ali Al-Naimi blocked appeals from poorer OPEC members for production cuts to support prices. Naimi argued that the oil market should be left to rebalance itself competitively at lower price levels, strategically rebuilding OPEC's long-term market share by ending the profitability of high-cost US shale oil production. As he explained in an interview:

Is it reasonable for a highly efficient producer to reduce output, while the producer of poor efficiency continues to produce? That is crooked logic. If I reduce, what happens to my market share? The price will go up and the Russians, the Brazilians, US shale oil producers will take my share... We want to tell the world that high-efficiency producing countries are the ones that deserve market share. That is the operative principle in all capitalist countries... One thing is for sure: Current prices [roughly US$60/bbl] do not support all producers.

A year later, when OPEC met in Vienna on 4 December 2015, the organization had exceeded its production ceiling for 18 consecutive months, US oil production had declined only slightly from its peak, world markets appeared to be oversupplied by at least 2 million barrels per day despite war-torn Libya pumping 1 million barrels below capacity, oil producers were making major adjustments to withstand prices as low as $40, Indonesia was rejoining the export organization, Iraqi production had surged after years of disorder, Iranian output was poised to rebound with the lifting of international sanctions, hundreds of world leaders at the Paris Climate Agreement were committing to limit carbon emissions from fossil fuels, and solar technologies were becoming steadily more competitive and prevalent. In light of all these market pressures, OPEC decided to set aside its ineffective production ceiling until the next ministerial conference in June 2016. By 20 January 2016, the OPEC Reference Basket was down to US$22.48/bbl – less than one-fourth of its high from June 2014 ($110.48), less than one-sixth of its record from July 2008 ($140.73), and back below the April 2003 starting point ($23.27) of its historic run-up.

As 2016 continued, the oil glut was partially trimmed with significant production offline in the US, Canada, Libya, Nigeria and China, and the basket price gradually rose back into the $40s. OPEC regained a modest percentage of market share, saw the cancellation of many competing drilling projects, maintained the status quo at its June conference, and endorsed "prices at levels that are suitable for both producers and consumers", although many producers were still experiencing serious economic difficulties.

2017–2020: production cut and OPEC+
As OPEC members grew weary of a multi-year supply-contest with diminishing returns and shrinking financial reserves, the organization finally attempted its first production cut since 2008. Despite many political obstacles, a September 2016 decision to trim approximately 1 million barrels per day was codified by a new quota-agreement at the November 2016 OPEC conference. The agreement (which exempted disruption-ridden members Libya and Nigeria) covered the first half of 2017 – alongside promised reductions from Russia and ten other non-members, offset by expected increases in the US shale-sector, Libya, Nigeria, spare capacity, and surging late-2016 OPEC production before the cuts took effect. Indonesia announced another "temporary suspension" of its OPEC membership rather than accepting the organization's requested 5-percent production-cut. Prices fluctuated around US$50/bbl, and in May 2017 OPEC decided to extend the new quotas through March 2018, with the world waiting to see if and how the oil-inventory glut might be fully siphoned-off by then. Longtime oil analyst Daniel Yergin "described the relationship between OPEC and shale as 'mutual coexistence', with both sides learning to live with prices that are lower than they would like." These production cut deals with non-OPEC countries are generally referred to as OPEC+.

In December 2017, Russia and OPEC agreed to extend the production cut of 1.8 mbpd until the end of 2018.

Qatar announced it would withdraw from OPEC effective 1 January 2019. According to the New York Times, this was a strategic response to the Qatar diplomatic crisis which Qatar was involved with Saudi Arabia, United Arab Emirates, Bahrain, and Egypt.

On 29 June 2019, Russia again agreed with Saudi Arabia to extend by six to nine months the original production cuts of 2018.

In October 2019, Ecuador announced it would withdraw from OPEC on 1 January 2020 due to financial problems facing the country.

In December 2019, OPEC and Russia agreed one of the deepest output cuts so far to prevent oversupply in a deal that will last for the first three months of 2020.

2020: Saudi-Russian price war

In early March 2020, OPEC officials presented an ultimatum to Russia to cut production by 1.5% of world supply. Russia, which foresaw continuing cuts as American shale oil production increased, rejected the demand, ending the three-year partnership between OPEC and major non-OPEC providers. Another factor was weakening global demand resulting from the COVID-19 pandemic. This also resulted in 'OPEC plus' failing to extend the agreement cutting 2.1 million barrels per day that was set to expire at the end of March. Saudi Arabia, which has absorbed a disproportionate amount of the cuts to convince Russia to stay in the agreement, notified its buyers on 7 March that they would raise output and discount their oil in April. This prompted a Brent crude price crash of more than 30% before a slight recovery and widespread turmoil in financial markets.

Several pundits saw this as a Saudi-Russian price war, or game of chicken which cause the "other side to blink first". Saudi Arabia had in March 2020 $500 billion of foreign exchange reserves, while at that time Russia's reserves were $580 billion. The debt-to-GDP ratio of the Saudis was 25%, while the Russian ratio was 15%. Another remarked that the Saudis can produce oil at as low a price as $3 per barrel, whereas Russia needs $30 per barrel to cover production costs. Another analyst claims that "it’s about assaulting the Western economy, especially America’s." In order to ward of from the oil exporters price war which can make shale oil production uneconomical, US may protect its crude oil market share by passing the NOPEC bill.

In April 2020, OPEC and a group of other oil producers, including Russia, agreed to extend production cuts until the end of July. The cartel and its allies agreed to cut oil production in May and June by 9.7 million barrels a day, equal to around 10% of global output, in an effort to prop up prices, which had previously fallen to record lows.

2021: Saudi-Emirati dispute
In July 2021, OPEC+ member United Arab Emirates rejected a Saudi proposed eight-month extension to oil output curbs which was in place due to COVID-19 and lower oil consumption. The previous year, OPEC+ cut the equivalent of about 10% of demand at the time. The UAE asked for the maximum amount of oil the group would recognize the country of producing to be raised to 3.8 million barrels a day compared to its previous 3.2 million barrels. A compromise deal allowed UAE to increase its maximum oil output to 3.65 million barrels a day. Per the terms of the agreement, Russia would increase its production from 11 million barrels to 11.5 million by May 2022 as well. All members would increase output by 400,000 barrels per day each month starting in August to gradually offset the previous cuts made due to the COVID pandemic.

2021–present global energy crisis

The record-high energy prices were driven by a global surge in demand as the world quit the economic recession caused by COVID-19, particularly due to strong energy demand in Asia. In August 2021, U.S. President Joe Biden's national security adviser Jake Sullivan released a statement calling on OPEC+ to boost oil production to "offset previous production cuts that OPEC+ imposed during the pandemic until well into 2022." On 28 September 2021, Sullivan met in Saudi Arabia with Saudi Crown Prince Mohammed bin Salman to discuss the high oil prices. The price of oil was about US$80 by October 2021, the highest since 2014. President Joe Biden and U.S. Energy Secretary Jennifer Granholm blamed the OPEC+ for rising oil and gas prices.

Russia's invasion of Ukraine in February 2022 has altered the global oil trade. EU leaders tried to ban the majority of Russian crude imports, but even prior to the official action imports to Northwest Europe were down. More Russian oil is now heading to nations including India and China.

In October 2022, key OPEC+ ministers agreed to oil production cuts of 2 million barrels per day, the first production cut since 2020. This led to renewed interest in the passage of NOPEC.

2022: oil production cut

In October 2022, OPEC+ led by Saudi Arabia announced a large cut to its oil output target which will anger the USA and aid Russia. In response, US President Joe Biden vowed "consequences" and said the US government would "re-evaluate" the longstanding U.S. relationship with Saudi Arabia. Robert Menendez, the Democratic chairman of the U.S. Senate Foreign Relations Committee, called for a freeze on cooperation with and arms sales to Saudi Arabia, accusing the kingdom of helping Russia underwrite its war with Ukraine.

Saudi Arabia's foreign ministry stated that the OPEC+ decision was "purely economic" and taken unanimously by all members of the conglomerate, pushing back on pressure to change its stance on the Russo-Ukrainian War at the UN. In response, the White House accused Saudi Arabia of pressuring other OPEC nations into agreeing with the production cut, some of which felt coerced, saying the United States had presented Riyadh with an analysis showing there was no market basis for the cut. National Security Council spokesman John Kirby said Riyadh knew the decision will "increase Russian revenues and blunt the effectiveness of sanctions" against Moscow, rejecting the Saudi claim that the move was "purely economic". According to a report in The Intercept, sources and experts said that Saudi Arabia had sought even deeper cuts than Russia, saying Saudi Crown Prince Mohammed bin Salman wants to sway the 2022 United States elections in favour of the GOP and the 2024 United States presidential election in favour of Donald Trump.

Membership

Current member countries
As of January 2020, OPEC has 13 member countries: five in the Middle East (Western Asia), seven in Africa, and one in South America. According to the U.S. Energy Information Administration (EIA), OPEC's combined rate of oil production (including gas condensate) represented 44% of the world's total in 2016, and OPEC accounted for 81.5% of the world's "proven" oil reserves.

Approval of a new member country requires agreement by three-quarters of OPEC's existing members, including all five of the founders. In October 2015, Sudan formally submitted an application to join, but it is not yet a member.

OPEC+ 
A number of non-OPEC member countries also participate in the organisation's initiatives such as voluntary supply cuts in order to further bind policy objectives between OPEC and non-OPEC members. This loose grouping of countries, known as OPEC+, includes Azerbaijan, Bahrain, Brunei, Kazakhstan, Malaysia, Mexico, Oman, Russia, South Sudan and Sudan.

Observers 
Since the 1980s, representatives from Egypt, Mexico, Norway, Oman, Russia, and other oil-exporting nations have attended many OPEC meetings as observers. This arrangement serves as an informal mechanism for coordinating policies.

Lapsed members

For countries that export petroleum at relatively low volume, their limited negotiating power as OPEC members would not necessarily justify the burdens imposed by OPEC production quotas and membership costs. Ecuador withdrew from OPEC in December 1992, because it was unwilling to pay the annual US$2 million membership fee and felt that it needed to produce more oil than it was allowed under its OPEC quota at the time. Ecuador then rejoined in October 2007 before leaving again in January 2020. Ecuador's Ministry of Energy and Non-Renewable Natural Resources released an official statement on 2 January 2020 which confirmed that Ecuador had left OPEC. Similar concerns prompted Gabon to suspend membership in January 1995; it rejoined in July 2016.

In May 2008, Indonesia announced that it would leave OPEC when its membership expired at the end of that year, having become a net importer of oil and being unable to meet its production quota. It rejoined the organization in January 2016, but announced another "temporary suspension" of its membership at year-end when OPEC requested a 5% production cut.

Qatar left OPEC on 1 January 2019, after joining the organization in 1961, to focus on natural gas production, of which it is the world's largest exporter in the form of liquified natural gas (LNG).

Market information
As one area in which OPEC members have been able to cooperate productively over the decades, the organization has significantly improved the quality and quantity of information available about the international oil market. This is especially helpful for a natural-resource industry whose smooth functioning requires months and years of careful planning.

Publications and research

In April 2001, OPEC collaborated with five other international organizations (APEC, Eurostat, IEA, UNSD) to improve the availability and reliability of oil data. They launched the Joint Oil Data Exercise, which in 2005 was joined by IEF and renamed the Joint Organisations Data Initiative (JODI), covering more than 90% of the global oil market. GECF joined as an eighth partner in 2014, enabling JODI also to cover nearly 90% of the global market for natural gas.

Since 2007, OPEC has published the "World Oil Outlook" (WOO) annually, in which it presents a comprehensive analysis of the global oil industry including medium- and long-term projections for supply and demand. OPEC also produces an "Annual Statistical Bulletin" (ASB), and publishes more-frequent updates in its "Monthly Oil Market Report" (MOMR) and "OPEC Bulletin".

Crude oil benchmarks

A "crude oil benchmark" is a standardized petroleum product that serves as a convenient reference price for buyers and sellers of crude oil, including standardized contracts in major futures markets since 1983. Benchmarks are used because oil prices differ (usually by a few dollars per barrel) based on variety, grade, delivery date and location, and other legal requirements.

The OPEC Reference Basket of Crudes has been an important benchmark for oil prices since 2000. It is calculated as a weighted average of prices for petroleum blends from the OPEC member countries: Saharan Blend (Algeria), Girassol (Angola), Djeno (Republic of the Congo) Rabi Light (Gabon), Iran Heavy (Islamic Republic of Iran), Basra Light (Iraq), Kuwait Export (Kuwait), Es Sider (Libya), Bonny Light (Nigeria), Arab Light (Saudi Arabia), Murban (UAE), and Merey (Venezuela).

North Sea Brent Crude Oil is the leading benchmark for Atlantic basin crude oils, and is used to price approximately two-thirds of the world's traded crude oil. Other well-known benchmarks are West Texas Intermediate (WTI), Dubai Crude, Oman Crude, and Urals oil.

Spare capacity
The US Energy Information Administration, the statistical arm of the US Department of Energy, defines spare capacity for crude oil market management "as the volume of production that can be brought on within 30 days and sustained for at least 90 days ... OPEC spare capacity provides an indicator of the world oil market's ability to respond to potential crises that reduce oil supplies."

By November 2015, the IEA changed its assessment "with OPEC's spare production buffer stretched thin, as Saudi Arabia – which holds the lion's share of excess capacity – and its Arabian Gulf neighbours pump at near-record rates."

See also

 Energy diplomacy
 List of country groupings
 List of intergovernmental organizations
 Oligopoly
 World oil market chronology from 2003
 Gasoline
 Peak oil
 Peak gas
 Arun-gas-field depleted year 2014

References

Further reading

 Ansari, Dawud. (2017) "OPEC, Saudi Arabia, and the shale revolution: Insights from equilibrium modelling and oil politics." Energy Policy 111 (2017): 166–178. online
 Claes, Dag Harald, and Giuliano Garavini eds. (2019) Handbook of OPEC and the Global Energy Order: Past, Present and Future Challenges (Routledge 2019) excerpt
 Colgan, Jeff D. (2014) "The emperor has no clothes: The limits of OPEC in the global oil market." International Organization 68.3 (2014): 599–632. online
Dudley, Bob. (2019) "BP energy outlook." Report–BP Energy Economics–London: UK 9 (2019) online.
 Economou, Andreas, and Bassam Fattouh. (2021) "OPEC at 60: the world with and without OPEC." OPEC Energy Review 45.1 (2021): 3-28. online, a historical perspective from 1990 to 2018.
 Evans, John (1986). OPEC, Its Member States and the World Energy Market. .
 Fesharaki, Fereidun (1983). OPEC, the Gulf, and the World Petroleum Market: A Study in Government Policy and Downstream Operations. .
 Garavini, Giuliano. (2019). The Rise and Fall of OPEC in the Twentieth Century. Oxford University Press.
 Gately, Dermot. (1984) "A ten-year retrospective: OPEC and the world oil market." Journal of Economic Literature 22.3 (1984): 1100–1114. summary of scholarly literature online

 
 Painter, David S (2014). "Oil and geopolitics: The oil crises of the 1970s and the cold war". Historical Social Research/Historische Sozialforschung. 186–208.
 Pickl, Matthias J. (2019) "The renewable energy strategies of oil majors–From oil to energy?." Energy Strategy Reviews 26 (2019): 100370. online
 Ratti, Ronald A., and Joaquin L. Vespignani. (2015) "OPEC and non-OPEC oil production and the global economy." Energy Economics 50 (2015): 364–378. online
 Skeet, Ian (1988). OPEC: Twenty-five Years of Prices and Politics. Cambridge UP.  online
 Van de Graaf, Thijs. (2020) "Is OPEC dead? Oil exporters, the Paris agreement and the transition to a post-carbon world." in Beyond market assumptions: Oil price as a global institution (Springer, Cham, 2020) pp. 63–77. online
 Woolfson, Charles, and Matthias Beck. (2019) "Corporate social responsibility in the international oil industry." in Corporate social responsibility failures in the oil industry.  (Routledge, 2019) pp. 1–14. online
 Yergin, Daniel (1991). The Prize: The Epic Quest for Oil, Money, and Power.  online
 Yergin, Daniel (2011). The quest : energy, security and the remaking of the modern world (2011) online

External links

 
 The OPEC Fund for International Development official website

 
Cartels
History of the petroleum industry
Petroleum
International energy organizations
Petroleum economics
Petroleum organizations
Petroleum politics
Organisations based in Vienna
Organizations established in 1960
20th century in Baghdad